Radical 161 or radical morning meaning "morning" is one of the 20 Kangxi radicals (214 radicals in total) composed of 7 strokes.

In the Kangxi Dictionary, there are 15 characters (out of 49,030) to be found under this radical.

In Chinese astrology,  represents the fifth Earthly Branch and corresponds to the Dragon in the Chinese zodiac.

 is also the 154th indexing component in the Table of Indexing Chinese Character Components predominantly adopted by Simplified Chinese dictionaries published in mainland China.

Evolution

Derived characters

Literature

External links

Unihan Database - U+8FB0

161
154